Popeye is a character in William Faulkner's 1931 novel Sanctuary. He is a Memphis, Tennessee-based criminal who rapes Temple Drake and introduces her into a criminal world which corrupts her.

Popeye is unable to sexually perform. Owing to this aspect of his body, in the original novel, Popeye instead uses a corncob to violate her. Doreen Fowler, author of "Reading for the "Other Side": Beloved and Requiem for a Nun," wrote that  Popeye wished to "despoil and possess the secret dark inner reaches of woman."

Adaptations
In the 1933 film The Story of Temple Drake he is replaced by Trigger, played by Jack La Rue. Trigger is able to sexually perform.

In the 1961 film Sanctuary the equivalent character is named Candy Man, played by Yves Montand. He is an amalgamation of the original Popeye; Red, another gangster; and Pete, Red's brother. Degenfelder described him as Cajun, while a publicity poster called him "Creole". Gene D. Phillips of Loyola University of Chicago  wrote that Candy's "French accent gives him an exotic quality" attracting Temple to him; the film has the character originate in New Orleans to match the change. Candy Man is able to sexually perform, and Phillips stated that when Temple is raped, Candy Man "demonstrates his virility unequivocally". According to Pauline Degenfelder, who analyzed several Faulkner stories and wrote academic articles about them, the new character name is a reference to his sexual allure and his job illegally transporting alcohol, as "candy" also referred to alcohol. Phillips stated that the merging of Pete into Candy Man means the film is made "more tightly into a continuous narrative" from the plots of the two original works, and also that the film does not have to make efforts to establish a new character towards the film's end.

Analysis
T. H. Adamowski wrote in Canadian Review of American Studies that usual characterizations of Popeye reflect an ""electric-light-stamped-tin" syndrome". Philip G. Cohen, David Krase, and Karl F. Zender, authors of a section on William Faulkner in Sixteen Modern American Authors, wrote that Adamowski's analysis of Popeye was "philosophically and psychologically sophisticated".

Legacy
Gene D. Phillips of Loyola University of Chicago wrote that Slim Grisson of No Orchids for Miss Blandish was "modeled after Popeye."

References
  - Published online by University of Toronto Press on March 10, 2011. Also available at Project MUSE
 This was reprinted in: Bleikasten, André and Nicole Moulinoux (editors). Douze lectures de Sanctuaire. PU de Rennes/Fondation William Faulkner (Rennes, France), 1995. p. 51-66.

Notes

Further reading
 
 "Is the Jinx of "Trigger" Still On? What effect had that role on the parts Jack Larue is now playing?" Photoplay, November 1933

Literary characters introduced in 1931
William Faulkner characters
Fictional American people
Fictional people from the 20th-century
Male characters in literature